"Moonlight Becomes You" (song), a 1942 popular song by Jimmy Van Heusen and Johnny Burke
Moonlight Becomes You (album), a 1994 album by Willie Nelson
Moonlight Becomes You (film), a 1998 TV-movie starring Donna Mills
Moonlight Becomes You (novel), a 1996 novel by Mary Higgins Clark